Dook may refer to:

People 
 Bill Dooks, Canadian politician
 Sam Dook, a member of The Go! Team

Other 
 Dook LaRue, an animatronic drummer in The Rock-afire Explosion
 The "dooking" noise a ferret makes

See also
 Duk (disambiguation)
 DUK (disambiguation)
 Duck (disambiguation)
 Dookie (disambiguation)
 Dooks, an aircraft manufacturer in Russia